Tony Northrup (born January 3, 1974) is an American author, photographer, and video instructor.

In June 2000, Northrup won the Sexiest Geek Alive contest. Following the contest he made appearances on several TV shows, including Good Morning America, the Montel Williams Show, and To Tell The Truth. Northrup has spoken at conferences and hosted events and webcasts. Northrup is regularly cited as a technology expert. Northrup created a series of videos and a book showing how to use technology to create custom solutions to common problems. Northrup, and his wife Chelsea Northrup, are also known for photographing and modeling for stock photography.

References

Computer science writers
American photographers
Living people
1974 births
American male writers
People from Binghamton, New York
People from Pflugerville, Texas
People from Waterford, Connecticut